Acacia daviesii, commonly known as tabletop wattle, is a shrub belonging to the genus Acacia and the subgenus Phyllodineae that is native to Victoria.

Description

Taxonomy
The species was first formally described by the botanist Marisa Bartolome as part of the work  A new, rare species of Acacia from north-eastern Victoria as published in the journal Australian Systematic Botany. It was reclassified as Racosperma daviesii by Leslie Pedley in 2003 then transferred back to the genus Acacia in 2006.

Distribution
The shrub is endemic to a small area in central Victoria and is only found at a few of sites to the south east of Mansfield around the Howqua River and Mount Timbertop where it can form dense stands. It is often part of dry open Eucalyptus woodland communities.

See also
 List of Acacia species

References

daviesii
Flora of Victoria (Australia)
Plants described in 2002